Hervé Magloire Otélé Nnanga (born 10 January 2000) is a Cameroonian footballer who plays as a forward.

Born in Cameroon, Otélé also holds French citizenship. He is a versatile forward, capable of playing as a winger or a second striker.

Career

Monza

Senior debut 
On 9 June 2018, Monza announced the signing of Otélé on a three-year contract. During the 2018–19 season, Otélé played two games in the Serie C with the senior team. He also played 14 games for the under-19 side in the Campionato Berretti, scoring five goals.

Loans to Giana Erminio and Milano City 
Otélé was sent on a one-year loan to Giana Erminio on 18 July 2019, where he played eight Serie C games. On 31 January 2020, he moved to Serie D club Milano City on a six-month loan. Otélé made his debut for Milano City on 2 February 2020 against Levico; he ended the season with three games.

Città di Varese 
On 8 August 2020, Otélé moved to newly founded Serie D club Città di Varese on a free contract. On 22 November 2020, he scored a brace to help Città di Varese win 4–0 against . Otélé finished the season with seven goals in 30 games.

Derthona 
On 13 August 2021, Otélé joined Serie D side Derthona.

Career statistics

References

External links 
 
 

2000 births
Living people
Cameroonian footballers
French footballers
Cameroonian emigrants to France
Association football forwards
Association football wingers
Association football midfielders
Toulouse FC players
FC Nantes players
A.C. Monza players
A.S. Giana Erminio players
Milano City F.C. players
A.S.D. Città di Varese players
A.S.D. HSL Derthona players
Serie C players
Serie D players
Cameroonian expatriate footballers
Cameroonian expatriate sportspeople in Italy
French expatriate footballers
French expatriate sportspeople in Italy
Expatriate footballers in Italy